was a town located in Nishisonogi District, Nagasaki Prefecture, Japan.

As of 2003, the town had an estimated population of 7,528 and a density of 359.68 persons per km2. The total area was 20.93 km2.

On January 4, 2005, Nomozaki, along with the towns of Iōjima, Kōyagi, Sanwa, Sotome and Takashima (all from Nishisonogi District), was merged into the expanded city of Nagasaki and no longer exists as an independent municipality.

Climate

References

External links
 Official website of the City of Nagasaki in Japanese (some English content)

Dissolved municipalities of Nagasaki Prefecture